The 1965 Texas Longhorns football team represented the University of Texas at Austin in the 1965 NCAA University Division football season.

Regular season
Tommy Nobis was in his final year at Texas and was known an iron man, playing (and starting) on both defense and offense for his entire college career.  Aside from being an All-American linebacker, he also played guard on the offensive side of the ball and was often the primary blocker on touchdown runs.  Famed Texas coach Darrell K Royal called him "the finest two-way player I have ever seen."  A knee injury slowed him during the latter part of his senior season, but he still was able to perform at a high level and won a number of major individual awards including the Knute Rockne Award, best lineman, the Outland Trophy, best interior lineman, and the Maxwell Award for college football's best player.  Nobis also finished seventh in the Heisman voting to USC's Mike Garrett. He appeared on the covers of LIFE, Sports Illustrated and TIME magazines.

Schedule
The Longhorns finished the regular season with a 6-4-0 record.

The season opener vs. Tulane was originally scheduled to be played in New Orleans, but significant destruction throughout the city caused by Hurricane Betsy prompted the site to be switched to Austin.

Game summaries

Oklahoma

    
    
    
    

Texas' eight straight win in the Red River series.

1965 team players in the NFL
The following players were drafted into professional football following the season.

Tommy Nobis was also drafted by the Houston Oilers in the first round of the 1966 American Football League draft.

Awards and honors
Tommy Nobis, Maxwell Award
Tommy Nobis, Outland Trophy
Tommy Nobis, Consensus All-American

References

Texas
Texas Longhorns football seasons
Texas Longhorns football